WMMT (88.7 FM) is a radio station licensed to Whitesburg, Kentucky, United States.  The station is currently owned by Appalshop, Incorporated.

Translators
In addition to the main station, WMMT is relayed by an additional seven translators to widen its broadcast area.

2022 Kentucky floods
The station was damaged during the 2022 floods.

Internet
The radio station is also available on the internet, from their website at www.wmmt.org

See also
Appalshop
List of community radio stations in the United States

References

External links

Community radio stations in the United States
Whitesburg, Kentucky
MMT